Robsart is an unincorporated hamlet within the rural municipality of Reno No. 51, in the province of Saskatchewan, Canada. Robsart had a population of 20 at the 2016 Canada Census (a 100% increase from 10 in the 2011 Canada Census). Robsart previously incorporated an independent village since 1912 until it was dissolved into an unincorporated community on January 1, 2002 under the jurisdiction of the rural municipality of Reno No. 51. Robsart is located 48 km southwest of the town of Eastend at the junction of Highway 18 and Highway 13 (also known as the historic Red Coat Trail) approximately 170 km south-east of Medicine Hat, Alberta, 68 km south of the Town of Maple Creek.

History 
Prior to January 1, 2002, Robsart was incorporated as a village, and was dissolved into an unincorporated community under the jurisdiction of the rural municipality of Reno on that date.

Demographics 

Infrastructure

 Great Western Railway, a Canadian short line railway company operating on former Canadian Pacific Railway trackage in southwest Saskatchewan.
 Red Coat Trail is a  historical route that approximates the path taken in 1874 by the North-West Mounted Police in their quest to bring law and order to the Canadian West.

History

In 1910, Canadian Pacific Railway (CPR) purchased a quarter section of land in the southwest region of Saskatchewan and called it Robsart. The land was named after Amy Robsart, from the Sir Walter Scott book, Kenilworth. Three years later the land was bought by a man named Henry Abbott, who led the first settlers to the new community. Shortly after the settlers arrived, many businesses started to go up quickly. Two of the first businesses were a general store and feed mill, and soon 30 other businesses, including a dentist, jeweller, and a surgeon, arrived.

Boom years
When the CPR finished the construction of the Stirling-Weyburn line, a boom occurred, bringing in even more prosperity for the small community. Almost weekly new businesses were opening, bringing new hotels, cafés, churches, livery barns, a school, banks, grain elevators, and its own public hospital which opened its doors in 1917 and still stands today. Ten years after the town of Robsart was established it had a population of 350 residents, its own town hall, mayor, town council, and around more than 50 businesses. The town was so prosperous that one postcard with a picture of Robsart bore the ironic motto “A town with a bright future.”

Great Depression

In the late 1920s, Robsart's prosperous beginnings began a long decline. Starting with a grain elevator fire in 1929, one year later another blaze wiped out a large section of the business core. Next was the  Great Depression, accompanying droughts, falling grain prices and poor crop yields, which caused further business closures in the once industrious business core. Many merchants were hit hard by crippling financial losses and had to leave in search for a better way of life. Since the beginning of the Great Depression the community has struggled but never with the same early pioneer optimism.

 
In the 1980s, locals and nearby farmers rallied together and renovated the old community hall in hopes of reviving the once thriving town, but one by one most remaining businesses and homes were boarded up, including Robsart's Saskatchewan Wheat Pool and Pioneer elevators which were demolished in 2000. Both had played a crucial role in the community over the years. Finally on January 1, 2002, due to dwindling population, the village of Robsart was dissolved, and is now governed by the Rural municipality of Reno No. 51.

Our Side of The Hills: community book
In the early 1990s, former and current residents of Robsart got together and made a community history book; Our Side of The Hills. Former mayor and resident Archie Smiley submitted a revised version of an old poem called "Ode to Robsart".

Attractions

Local attractions/sites of interest:

 Robsart Art Works, open July 1 to August 28, 2010 from 1 to 4 p.m. and by appointment, features Saskatchewan artists featuring photographers of old buildings and towns throughout Saskatchewan.
 Beaver lumber Co. Ltd., one of the last remaining original storefronts along Main Street.
 Robsart Hospital, a former community hospital opened in 1918 which still stands today and is known as the only known pioneer hospital of its kind in Saskatchewan, if not Western Canada.
 Robsart Community Hall, refinished in the 1980s by locals and farmers and still in use today for special occasions.
 Robsart Community Curling Rink, no longer in use but still stands.
 Vidora Cafe, a former cafe saved from demolition and moved from Vidora to Robsart. The cafe is one of few buildings that originate from Vidora. Only two other buildings still stand on Vidora's original town site, old foundations and wooden sidewalks can still be seen when walking the streets of the former town site.

Regional attractions:

 Cypress Hills Interprovincial Park, an interprovincial park straddling the southern Alberta-Saskatchewan border, located north-west of Robsart. It is Canada's first and only interprovincial park.
 Cypress Hills Vineyard & Winery, open by appointment only from Christmas until May 14.

Notable people

 Eiliv Anderson, born in Robsart in 1934; was a corporate executive, with a degree from the executive program of Queen's University's School of Business

See also
 List of communities in Saskatchewan

References

Reno No. 51, Saskatchewan
Former villages in Saskatchewan
Designated places in Saskatchewan
Unincorporated communities in Saskatchewan
Populated places established in 1910
Ghost towns in Saskatchewan
Populated places disestablished in 2002